Seethalakshmi Prakash (born May 7, 2005) is an Indian singer. She rose to fame in 2020 when she was crowned Flowers TV "Top Singer", winning the marathon first season of the popular Flowers TV series, "Top Singer".

She has recorded over 20 songs in Malayalam and made guest television and video-link concert appearances in India and abroad. She has performed on multiple albums, collaborating with musicians like Vidyadharan Master and Abhijith Kollam. She has over 300,000 followers on social media.

Career 
During the 22-month, daily primetime run of the Top Singer premiere, Seethalakshmi competed in a total of 82 episodes and was judged "best performer of the day" in 38 of these. With the grand prize for the season, her prizes – a house and a scholarship – amounted to some US$95,000.

After her win in Top Singer, Seethalakshmi has performed concerts by video-link for audiences in London, UK, Philadelphia, USA and Kuwait. She made multiple guest appearances on the new season of "Top Singer" and on Flowers TV, and recorded a music video, “Varavelpu”, directed by award-winning director Rajesh Irulam

She received the Prem Nazir memorial award for the best female singer in Malayalam Television for 2021.

Family 
Seethalakshmi's parents are Prakash Puthunilam and Bindu Prakash.

Discography (Selected)

See also 
List of Top Singer episodes

References

External links 

Living people
2005 births
21st-century Indian women singers
21st-century Indian singers
Singers from Kerala
Singing talent show winners
Malayalam-language singers
People from Changanassery